Matthew Constant (born August 17, 1998) is a Canadian-American soccer player.

Career

Youth 
Constant spent 7 years as part of the Dallas Texans USSDA academy side.

College & amateur 
Constant played college soccer at the University of New Mexico for two seasons in 2016 and 2017. He made 38 appearances, scoring one goal for the Lobos. In 2019, Constant transferred to the University of North Carolina at Chapel Hill, where he played two further seasons, including a truncated 2020 season due to the COVID-19 pandemic. For the Tar Heels, Constant made 18 appearances. He scored a single goal and tallied a single assist.

Whilst at college, Constant also played in the USL League Two, appearing for Texas United in 2018 and Wake FC in 2019.

Professional 
On January 21, 2021, Constant was selected 50th overall in the 2021 MLS SuperDraft by Sporting Kansas City. He signed with the club's USL Championship side Sporting Kansas City II on April 28, 2021. Following the 2021 season, Kansas City opted to declined their contract option on Constant.

International 
Constant has represented the United States at under-17 level and Canada at under-20 level in 2016 and 2017.

Personal 
Both of Constant's parents are from Manitoba, Canada.

References

External links 
 Matthew Constant New Mexico bio
 Matt Constant - Men's Soccer UNC-Chapel Hill bio
 

1998 births
Living people
American people of Canadian descent
Citizens of Canada through descent
Canadian soccer players
Association football defenders
New Mexico Lobos men's soccer players
North Carolina Tar Heels men's soccer players
Sporting Kansas City draft picks
Sporting Kansas City II players
People from Dallas
Soccer players from Texas
USL Championship players
USL League Two players
United States men's youth international soccer players
Canada men's youth international soccer players